Kilowog is a superhero appearing in American comic books published by DC Comics. The character is a member of the Green Lantern Corps.

The character appeared in the 2011 Green Lantern film, voiced by Michael Clarke Duncan.

Publication history
Kilowog first appears in Green Lantern Corps #201 and was created by Steve Englehart and Joe Staton.

Fictional character biography

Origins
A towering alien with a brutish cross of porcine and bull-doggish appearance, Kilowog is renowned throughout the Green Lantern Corps as the primary trainer of the Corps' newest recruits. The Guardians of the Universe recruited Kilowog, a gifted genetic scientist, from the planet Bolovax Vik, located in Space Sector 674. Kilowog was trained by Lantern Ermey (reference to Gunnery Sergeant R. Lee Ermey), who would often use the word "poozer", which means "useless rookie" (a word Kilowog would later adopt, albeit in a friendlier way). In the middle of a particularly arduous training session, Ermey had Kilowog and his fellow rookies help stop an attack on a group of Lanterns, one of whom was the future renegade Sinestro. Ermey, fatally wounded in battle, commended Kilowog on his abilities, telling him that he had the makings of a great leader. In addition to serving with distinction as the Green Lantern of that sector, Kilowog also began to spend extensive periods of time on the Green Lantern Corps' home planet of Oa instructing new recruits on how to handle and best utilize their power rings. In this capacity, Kilowog acted as the first trainer to a young Hal Jordan, the ring-recruited successor to the slain Abin Sur of Ungara, the Green Lantern of Space Sector 2814. Kilowog and his new recruit helped the Guardians confront Abin Sur's murderer, the hive mind interstellar malefactor known as Legion.

Crisis
During the Crisis on Infinite Earths (referred to as a "great crisis"), Bolovax Vik was destroyed. This was a powerful blow to the giant Green Lantern, as his race lived a highly communal lifestyle, and to be alone was one of the worst things imaginable. Owing somehow to this genetic similarity to and affinity for each other that all Bolovax Vikians possessed, Kilowog was able to rescue the entire population of his homeworld (billions of beings) by storing their collective life essences within his ring upon that world's annihilation.

The Crisis saw the immortal Guardians ethically divided (a faction of six Guardians broke away from the majority, deciding to follow the example of their estranged brethren The Controllers and create their own Green Lanterns to directly combat the Anti-Monitor, but five of them were killed shortly after they chose their first and only recruit, Guy Gardner of Earth) and their ranks depleted for the first time in millions of years (only 22 of the 36 Guardians survived). The Corps as well suffered hundreds of casualties. The Guardians then decided to end their direct leadership of the Corps, and left for another dimension with their former mates, the Zamarons.

Earth years
Before leaving, the Guardians informed the remaining Green Lanterns that the Corps was now theirs to administer; they were no longer bound by their former assignment to one particular Space Sector and could deploy themselves as they saw fit. Adrift following the destruction of his Sector and the end of his role training new Green Lanterns for the Guardians, Kilowog relocated to Earth with his former pupil Jordan and the group of Green Lanterns that had decided to make their base there. They ultimately became the Green Lantern Corps of Earth. While his appearance at first frightened most humans, Kilowog briefly became a celebrity following his defeat of the villain Black Hand on live television in a battle over Anaheim Stadium. 

This goodwill was soon squandered, though, when he was approached by a KGB agent and invited to live in the Union of Soviet Socialist Republics, as the society of Bolovax Vik was somewhat similar to a communist system. During his time in the USSR, Kilowog was instrumental in the creation of the Soviet Union's first super-powered force, the Rocket Red Brigade. Kilowog ultimately became disenchanted with the U.S.S.R. and the flawed communist nations of Earth.

While adventuring with the Green Lantern Corps of Earth, Kilowog found a world in Space Sector 872 which would make a suitable "Bolovax Vik II". Moved to action, he tapped into his ring and reconstituted the entire population of his world, some 16 billion beings. No sooner had he done this, though, than the world was obliterated by the renegade Green Lantern Sinestro, and all 16 billion Bolovax Vikians were permanently killed. The trauma of this drove Kilowog temporarily insane, but he was helped back to his senses by fellow Green Lantern Arisia, to whom he confessed his love. He was also supported by other Green Lanterns, who made an effort to be near him, as they knew Kilowog's race enjoyed being in crowds.

Shortly after this adventure, the Corps was finally and completely destroyed when they voted as a body to execute the captured Sinestro for crimes against the universe; this set in motion a chain of events that led to the dissolution of almost all power rings. Around this time, Kilowog is allowed to be one of the honor guard at Superman's funeral.

Emerald Twilight
When the Corps began to expand again, Kilowog returned to Oa to train the new generation of Green Lanterns. During the Emerald Twilight arc, numerous Green Lanterns were sent to stop the supposedly insane Hal Jordan. The very last Green Lantern to oppose Jordan was Kilowog himself, on Oa. He attempted to prevent his old pupil from entering and absorbing the power of the Great Battery itself, which destroyed the Corps. Kilowog was disintegrated with a blast by Jordan's ring, leaving nothing but a seared skull and ashes, and a shaken but undeterred Jordan stole the energies of the Great Battery.  The remaining guardians sacrificed themselves by merging their life forces into the final green lantern ring.  The only Guardian left to bestow the ring was Ganthet.

Dark Lantern
The enigmatic being known as Dark Lantern seemed strangely familiar to those closely acquainted with the legacy of the Green Lantern Corps when he first made his presence known on Earth.

He was created by some of the remaining Green Lanterns who had lost their rings when Hal Jordan went mad. Based on Xudar, they called themselves the "Brotherhood of the Cold Flame". Boodikka was one of their number. They tapped into arcane forces and based on the unusual nature of the Bolovax Vik afterlife, they converted the soul of Kilowog into the Dark Lantern to send him after Jordan.

When Jordan became the Spectre, he convinced his old friend Tom Kalmaku to help correct his sins against the Green Lantern Corps. Kalmaku used Hal's old power ring to rebuild Oa and the Great Battery as shown in Green Lantern Legacy: The Last Will and Testament of Hal Jordan. This allowed the vengeful spirit of Kilowog to rest. Soon after this, though, his spirit was recalled to life by Kyle Rayner and Ganthet.

The New Corps
After the reformation of the Corps, Kilowog retakes the role of Green Lantern drill sergeant, training new recruits under the Guardians of the Universe. In the Infinite Crisis storyline, Kilowog, along with Kyle Rayner, played a key role in the Rann–Thanagar War and its aftermath.

In Superman/Batman #30 (2007) Kilowog is deeply affected by a force that has turned most of the superpowered aliens allied with Earth hostile against all humans. He, or the force controlling him, attempts to violently sway Superman into hating all humans, but a confused Man of Steel does not fall for it. It is later revealed that Kilowog and other alien heroes are being affected by Despero and an alien armada. The threat is swiftly neutralized by Superman and Batman.

Once again, in Green Lantern Corps (vol. 2) #11 (2007) Kilowog is pushed, apparently from a Despotellis-infected Mogo, into a xenophobic hate against the Guardians and the Corps, acting with imagery of his dead people. Kilowog fell victim to the deception.

During the Sinestro Corps War, Kilowog was on the front line during the battle of Mogo. When the conflict moved to Earth, Kilowog battled his Sinestro Corps counterpart, Arkillo. Kilowog defeated the villain and removed his ring. After the war's climax, Kilowog was seen on Mogo, eating dinner with energy constructs of his family members.

"Blackest Night"
During the 2009 "Blackest Night" storyline, Oa is invaded by a swarm of black power rings, that turn all the deceased Lanterns in the Oan crypt into Black Lanterns, who promptly attack the living Lanterns. Kilowog is attacked by the reanimated Ermey, who berates him for not preventing his death, and for saving the life of Sinestro, citing the deaths Sinestro had caused as being Kilowog's fault. He also torments Kilowog over the death of the current class of Green Lantern rookies, whom Ermey himself has just slain. Gaining the upper hand, Ermey attempts to rip out Kilowog's heart, but is interrupted by the announcement that Black Lanterns' rings have reached one hundred percent power. Subsequently, the Black Lanterns are given new instructions: to devour the Central Power Battery. Ermey departs for his new objective, joined by the rookie Lanterns he had just killed. Kilowog then joins his fellow Green Lanterns in their attempt to protect the Central Power Battery.

"War of the Green Lanterns"
In 2011 storyline "War of the Green Lanterns", Kilowog and Arissa accompany Guy Gardner on a mission to the 'unexplored sectors'. The three defeat a powerful telepath. They also avenge the death of several Lanterns, a concept Kilowog is becoming increasingly unable to process.

When Krona launches his attack on the Green Lantern Corps by infecting the power battery with Parallax, Kilowog is the only alien Lantern not to fall under Krona's influence due to his past experience with the entity. However, Krona quickly deduces the reasons for his greater resistance, forcibly placing a new ring on Kilowog's finger to bring him under his control.

Following the war, Kilowog briefly attempts to resign from the Corps after the Guardians discharge Hal Jordan and allow Sinestro to at least provisionally remain a Lantern, but is convinced to rethink his decision by Salaak due to the obvious upheaval the Corps will have to undergo in future due to the destruction of Mogo. Kilowog instead retires from his duties as a drill instructor, which is taken over by the robotic GL 'Stel'.

The New 52
In 2011 DC Comics cancelled its entirely line of monthly comics, and restarted it with 52 new titles, featuring a rebooted continuity, an endeavor called the New 52. In this new continuity, Kilowog is back to being drill instructor of the Green Lantern Corps, and is part of the team that breaks John Stewart out of prison when the Alpha Lanterns sentence him to death. He and Salaak have also uncovered the Guardians' plans regarding the Third Army. Later when the Guardians attempt to lure their Green Lantern members to Oa under a fake inoculation treatment for the Third Army so they would be assimilated into it, Kilowog by then had secretly contacted trusted members within the corps and assembled them into a small army to face the Guardians. By having the now powerless Guy Gardner serve as a distraction, Kilowog used the opportunity to seize control of the Central Power Battery and not only freed the Lantern members the Guardians immobilized, but also ended the communication blackout allowing him to warn the approaching members of the Guardians deceit.

Kilowog stays with the Lanterns through the destruction and overthrow of the Guardians. He accepts the leadership of Hal Jordan. Despite knowing use of the lantern power endangers the universe, Kilowog volunteers to fight back when the actions of the 'New Gods' endangers all ring wielders.

Powers and abilities
As a Green Lantern, Kilowog possesses the same power ring and power battery used by all GLs. The Great Power Battery, located on Oa, is the repository for billions of years' worth of willpower in energy form. This energy has been harnessed and focused by the Guardians and is tapped by each GL's power battery. This in turns feeds it to their individual power rings. By applying willpower and concentration, the ring is literally able to accomplish anything of which the wielder can conceive, and is therefore as limited or limitless in abilities as the wielder. In Kilowog's case, he has shown an affinity for creating astoundingly complex machinery using the ring. In terms of combat, Kilowog tends to eschew the "giant boxing glove" fighting style of Hal Jordan and mainly uses his ring to fly and to absorb any enemy's attacks long enough for him to get close enough to batter them into unconsciousness.

According to the 2005 miniseries Green Lantern: Rebirth, Kilowog's ring is the only one that Hal Jordan knows of that makes a sound when being used. 

In addition to his power ring, Kilowog possesses the natural super strength and durability of his species, as well as a powerful intellect that surpasses many of his fellow corpsmen. Under mind control, Kilowog even manages to combine all of these abilities to easily hold his own against Superman.

Other versions

Elseworlds
Kilwog appeared in various Elseworlds tales: including JLA: The Nail, its sequel, Batman: In Darkest Knight, and Superman: Last Son of Earth.

Flashpoint
In the alternate timeline of the Flashpoint event, Kilowog is killed by Nekron.

Fourth Reich
In an alternate future where the Earth is controlled by Nazi supermen, Kilowog is one of the thousands of Green Lanterns to participate in a rescue mission. All who participate are slain.

Planetary
In an alternate universe ruled by evil versions of the 'Planetary' heroes, Kilowog's corpse is one of many Green Lanterns on display in the Planetary headquarters.

Injustice: Gods Among Us
During the Year Two series, Kilowog and a group of Green Lanterns are sent to Earth to retrieve Superman, who has undergone a transformation into the new ruler of Earth. He and the other Lanterns engage in a battle, seemingly winning until Sinestro kills the Lantern Ch'p and the Green Lanterns are rendered helpless. Not willing to kill them but not wanting to send them back to the Guardians, Superman chooses to take them as prisoners of war. Kilowog and the Lanterns are not seen again until the Year Four annual, where it is revealed they have been held captive in the Trench, an underwater prison designed to hold all the Regime's enemies. When helping Plastic Man with a prison break, Kilowog is killed by Sinestro before they all can escape.

Earth One
In the alternate universe of Earth One, Kilowog is a scientist living on Bolovax Vik, one of the few independent planets left in explored space, at the fringes of the Manhunter's sphere of influence. He is the latest in a long line of self-proclaimed Green Lanterns and protectors of Bolovax, he wears a homemade uniform and carries a power ring and battery passed down through the centuries following the destruction of the Corps. When 
Hal Jordan  crashlands on Bolovax, Kilowog treats his wounds and gives him some basic lessons in the history of the Green Lanterns and the use of his power ring. The Homeguard, the military of Bolovax, attempt to arrest and destroy Jordan for fear that he will bring the Manhunters to their world, but the point is rendered moot when the Manhunters attack anyway. The two pseudo-Lanterns are unable to beat the Manhunter invasion force, and Jordan escapes with an unconscious Kilowog, and the two of them decide to seek out the few remaining ring bearers in the galaxy to help fight off the assault on Bolovax. After multiple failed attempts, the two are separated when Jordan is captured by a Manhunter slave ship and taken to Oa. Kilowog is the first to respond to Jordan's distress call, and joins him in nominating Arisia for leader of the new Green Lantern Corps. After the Central Power Battery is liberated, Kilowog and Jordan successfully fight of the stragglers of the Manhunter force on Bolovax.

In other media

Film

Live action
 Kilowog appears in the live-action Green Lantern film, physically portrayed by Spencer Wilding and voiced by Michael Clarke Duncan. As before, Kilowog puts Hal Jordan through his training course in ring-slinging, saying he has never seen a human before and stating that Hal "smells funny". However, when Jordan defeats Parallax single-handedly, Kilowog is pleased at how well he trained him.
 In Justice League (2017), a scene depicting Green Lanterns Kilowog and Tomar-Re visiting Batman was filmed as an additional post-credits scene, further teasing the upcoming Green Lantern Corps, but the scene was later cut.
 In Zack Snyder's Justice League (2021), Kilowog appears in a vision, experienced by Victor Stone/Cyborg, as a corpse in the "Knightmare" timeline where Superman falls victim to Darkseid's Anti-Life Equation.

Animation
 Kilowog appears in Green Lantern: First Flight, voiced by Michael Madsen. Kilowog is initially distrustful of Hal Jordan, even demanding that he return Abin Sur's ring to him, despite being given it. Kilowog is later shown to be upset that the Guardians assigned Sinestro to train Jordan, since the job usually went to Kilowog. Later Jordan saved Kilowog while chasing Kanjar Ro and starts to trust him, when they discover that Sinestro framed Jordan for Kanjar Ro's murder. After Sinestro uses the yellow battery to destroy the green battery, the now powerless Green Lanterns are ordered to give up their rings. Kilowog refuses and Sinestro holds Kilowog in front of the yellow battery saying that Kilowog "wasn't going to survive this anyway". However, Jordan saves Kilowog from Sinestro. After Jordan knocks Sinestro back to the surface, Kilowog crushes his hand and ring. Kilowog discovers that his ring still has some power left, saves Jordan from a free-fall.
 Kilowog appears in Green Lantern: Emerald Knights, voiced by Henry Rollins. His segment of the film involves his training and how he gained his current position.
 Kilowog makes a brief appearance in Teen Titans Go! To the Movies.
 Kilowog makes a brief appearance in Justice League vs. the Fatal Five, voiced by Kevin Michael Richardson.
 Kilowog makes a brief appearance in Justice League Dark: Apokolips War, voiced again by John DiMaggio. He was one of the many Green Lanterns defending Oa from Darkseid only for him to be killed by Darkseid breaking his neck, during his call with a brainwashed Batman.

Television

 Kilowog appears in Justice League, voiced by Dennis Haysbert. This portrayal of Kilowog casts him in a more jovial light, although at no loss of his significant competence as a Lantern. He first appears in the episode "In Blackest Night", attending the trial of John Stewart for the crime of destroying an entire planet. His next - and most substantial - appearance was in the episode "Hearts and Minds". After a battle with Despero's forces on Kalanor, Kilowog arrived at Earth badly injured, and when John found him, his mention of Katma Tui sent John off to find Katma. J'onn J'onzz brought Kilowog back to health, and he and Flash went to go find John's lantern battery so Kilowog could recharge. Kilowog brings Flash, J'onn, and Hawkgirl to Kalanor to join the fight against Despero that Katma and John have already been participating in. In determining how to fight Despero and his Flame of Py'tar, Kilowog suggests a carbon bomb, a complex explosive that he himself ends up constructing to exact perfection. The bomb ends up not being used, as the Py'tar is alive and suffering under Despero's reign, but Kilowog's actions in the episode still prove quite impressive. In this episode, he and The Flash are shown to be very friendly with each other. Also, he, along with Kyle Rayner, Katma, and a few other Green Lanterns, makes a non-speaking appearance at Superman's funeral in the episode "Hereafter". Kilowog also makes a non-speaking appearance in the Justice League Unlimited episode "The Return", as one of many Lanterns fighting Amazo.
 Kilowog appeared in the Duck Dodgers episode "The Green Loontern", voiced by John DiMaggio.
 Kilowog appeared in the Batman: The Brave and the Bold episode "Day of the Dark Knight", voiced by Diedrich Bader. He was taking in a prisoner when Guy Gardner's antics caused that prisoner to go into rage. Thanks to him and Batman, he was caught. In "The Eyes of Despero!", he was in Hal Jordan's army when he was brainwashed by Despero. He was later revealed to be alive and was in Hal's Power Ring. In "Revenge of the Reach", Kilowog was present when the Reach invade Oa.
 Kilowog is a main character in Green Lantern: The Animated Series, voiced by Kevin Michael Richardson, reprising his role from Green Lantern: Rise of the Manhunters. He travels through Frontier Space on the Interceptor with Hal Jordan and is one of the strongest agents in the fight against the Red Lantern Corps. In this adaptation, Kilowog uses his famous "poozer" line to refer to Hal when both his and Hal's rings are out of power.
 Kilowog appears in Teen Titans Go!, voiced by Scott Menville.
 Kilowog appears in DC Super Hero Girls, voiced by Jason Spisak. He is shown training Jessica Cruz for her battle with Star Sapphire.
 Kilowog appears in Young Justice: Phantoms, voiced again by Kevin Michael Richardson.
 Kilowog will appear in the upcoming live-action HBO Max Green Lantern television series.

Miscellaneous
Kilowog is featured in the Smallville Season 11 digital comic based on the TV series.

Video games
 Diedrich Bader reprises his role of Kilowog in Batman: The Brave and the Bold – The Videogame.
 Charlie Campbell voices Kilowog in DC Universe Online. Kilowog can also be unlocked to use in Legends PVP matches, where players can use an iconic hero or villain to use in short player versus player matches. Kilowog fights using the Brawling skills, enabling a slow but brutal fighting style, and will use powers based on solid light constructs, like hammers that will pound on the enemy players.
 Kilowog appears in Green Lantern: Rise of the Manhunters, voiced by Kevin Michael Richardson.
 Kilowog makes a cameo appearance during Green Lantern's victory pose in Injustice: Gods Among Us.
 Kilowog appears as a playable character in Lego Batman 3: Beyond Gotham, voiced by Travis Willingham.

References

External links
 Kilowog entry in the Book Of Oa

Characters created by Steve Englehart
Comics characters introduced in 1986

DC Comics aliens
DC Comics demons
Fictional characters with superhuman durability or invulnerability
DC Comics characters with superhuman strength
DC Comics extraterrestrial superheroes
DC Comics film characters
DC Comics male superheroes
DC Comics martial artists
DC Comics scientists
Fictional geneticists
Green Lantern Corps officers